Ventspils University College is a higher education establishment in Ventspils, Latvia.

History
Ventspils University College (VUC) was founded in 1997 as a self-governing state university college and a scientific institution. Its basic activity is to carry out scientific research and to implement academic and professional study programmes. On May 20, 2013, VUC acquired scientific institution status, which shows that it has met all state-adopted criteria for a scientific body.

Structure
Ventspils University College has an elected rector, currently Kārlis Krēsliņš. The university has three faculties, a library and a few scientific institutions.

Faculty of Information Technologies
Dean: Vairis Caune

This is the newest faculty founded in 2006. There are available programmes that provide bachelor's and master's degrees in Computer Science and Electronics. In 2014 it is planned to establish a new international study programme in English, thus allowing foreign students to obtain a bachelor's degree.

Faculty of Economics and Management
Dean: Liene Resele

Current study programmes allow to get a bachelor's, master's or PhD degree in Business Administration, therefore providing professional workforce for a large number of local companies.

Faculty of Translation Studies
Dean: Aiga Veckalne

This faculty currently is the most popular by the number of enrolled students. One of the main objectives is to prepare the intercultural communication specialists with foreign language skills for the work in EU institutions and other international organizations.

Centre for Applied Linguistics
The Centre for Applied Linguistics of Ventspils University College is an internationally recognized scientific institution that specializes in  language and translation as well as technology applications.

Centre for Entrepreneurship, Innovation and Regional Development
Centre for Entrepreneurship Innovation and Regional Development is financially inspired by the Ventspils City Municipality and aims to enhance the intellectual potential of Ventspils City, Kurzeme Region and Latvia. It focus on performing scientific work in the areas of entrepreneurship, innovation and regional development.

Ventspils International Radio Astronomy Centre – VIRAC

This centre oversees the world's eighth-largest radio telescope that  was used by the Soviet military to spy on Western countries during the Cold War.

The Technology transfer centre of Kurzeme
This centre analyzes the ability of Engineering research centre of Ventspils University College and Ventspils International Radioastronomy Center to offer businessmen research services in accordance with businessmen needs and promotes the cooperation between Latvian and European scientists and businessmen.

International Cooperation
Ventspils University College has Erasmus Bilateral Agreements with more than 60 universities. Some of these include:

Notable people

Professors 
 Jānis Vucāns (b. 1956), former rector of Ventspils University College, politician

Alumni 
 Dana Reizniece-Ozola (b. 1981), chess player, politician
 Haralds Silovs (b. 1986), long track and former short track speed skater
 Madara Palameika (b. 1987), javelin thrower

References

External links
Official website

Universities in Latvia